Food Protein-Induced Enterocolitis Syndrome (FPIES) is a systemic, non IgE-mediated response to a specific trigger within food - most likely food protein.  FPIES presents in two different forms: an acute form and a chronic form.  In its acute form, FPIES presents with vomiting that usually begins 1 to 4 hours after trigger food ingestion (can be 30 minutes to 6 or more hours). Vomiting is often followed by a paleness to the skin, lethargy, and potentially watery, perhaps blood-tinged diarrhea.  In the severe form of acute FPIES, a person will vomit until dehydration and until a shock-like state, which occurs in 15% of patients.  In its chronic form, which can be difficult to diagnose until a person has already met diagnostic criteria for acute FPIES, after repeated or regular ingestion of the trigger food, the person presents with chronic or episodic vomiting, failure to thrive, and watery, perhaps blood-tinged diarrhea.  FPIES can potentially develop at any age but seems most commonly to develop within the first few years of life.  FPIES has mainly been documented in young infants, but can exist in older children and adults. Some people develop both FPIES and an IgE-mediated type of reaction to the same food, and having FPIES can increase a person's risk of also developing IgE-mediated food allergies.

Signs and symptoms
In the severe form, symptoms include abdominal pain, profuse vomiting, lethargy, potentially diarrhea, and even shock. Additional symptoms could potentially include - but are not limited to - headache, pallor, lethargy, constipation, and abdominal swelling (distension). Laboratory studies might reveal hypoalbuminemia, anemia, eosinophilia, and an elevated white blood cell count with a left shift.  Over half of patients experiencing an acute FPIES reaction may develop thrombocytosis (platelets >500x109/L).  In both chronic and acute FPIES, both methemoglobinemia and metabolic acidosis (mean pH around 7.03 in one study) have been reported. Endoscopy may reveal a gastric erythema, edema, mucosal friability, and gastric antral erosions. The exact mechanism is unclear, but it is hypothesized to be a T cell driven disorder. Upon re-exposure to the offending food after a period of elimination, a subacute syndrome can present with repetitive emesis and dehydration.

Diagnosis
Diagnosis is primarily based on history as specific IgE and skin prick tests are typically negative and the exclusion of other disorders that present similar clinical features, such as infectious gastroenteritis, celiac disease, inflammatory bowel disease, necrotizing enterocolitis, food protein-induced enteropathy, food protein-induced proctocolitis, and eosinophilic gastroenteritis, among others.

Treatment
Avoid feeding affected individuals the foods known to trigger an allergic response. Cow's milk, soy, and cereal grains are the most common trigger foods, but other foods have been reported including eggs, meats (poultry, beef, pork), seafood (fish, shrimp, mollusks), peanut, potatoes, nuts, and fruits (apple, pear, banana, peach, watermelon). The list of potential food triggers is varied and can be somewhat region specific.  There are also cases of FPIES being transmitted through foods in breast milk in rare occasions.  During an acute FPIES episode, ondansetron is often used to control symptoms in children over 6 months of age. Many breastfeeding mothers either eliminate the food from their diet although this is not always necessary or switch to an extensively hydrolyzed or elemental formula if there is a concern about cow's milk being an offending culprit.  Some children tolerate soy based formulas if they have FPIES to cow's milk but many do not.  Most infants diagnosed with FPIES outgrow it by the time they reach school age or sometime within their school-aged years.

References

External links
 International FPIES Association (I-FPIES)

Allergology